The list of shipwrecks in July 1823 includes all ships sunk, foundered, grounded, or otherwise lost during July 1823.

1 July

3 July

4 July

5 July

6 July

7 July

9 July

12 July

13 July

14 July

15 July

19 July

20 July

21 July

23 July

24 July

28 July

30 July

31 July

Unknown date

References

1823-07